Li Xingzhong (李興中) (January 12, 1890 – July 24, 1962) was a KMT general from Zhili Province. He graduated from the Baoding Military Academy in 1914. During the Xi'an Incident, he supported Zhang Xueliang and Yang Hucheng. He commanded the 4th Army Group from June 1945 to March 1947. He stayed on the mainland after the communist victory.

National Revolutionary Army generals from Hebei
1890 births
1962 deaths